This is a list of compositions by Frédéric Chopin by opus number. There is a separate list by genre.

Most of Chopin's compositions were for solo piano, although he did compose two piano concertos (his concertos No. 1 and No. 2 are two of the romantic piano concerto repertoire's most often-performed pieces) as well as some other music for ensembles. His larger scale works such as sonatas, the four scherzi, the four ballades, the Fantaisie in F minor, Op. 49, and the Barcarole in F major, Op. 60 have cemented a solid place within the repertoire, as well as shorter works like his polonaises, mazurkas, waltzes, impromptus, rondos, and nocturnes taking a substantial portion of recorded and performed music. Two important collections are the Études, Op. 10 and 25 (which are a staple of that genre for pianists), and the 24 Preludes, Op. 28 (a cycle of short pieces paired in a major key/relative minor key pattern following the circle of fifths in clockwise steps). In addition, he wrote numerous song settings of Polish texts, and chamber pieces including a piano trio and a cello sonata.

This listing uses the traditional opus numbers where they apply; other works are identified by numbers from the catalogues of Maurice J. E. Brown (B), Krystyna Kobylańska (KK), Józef Michał Chomiński (A, C, D, E, P, S), and the Chopin National Edition (WN).

The last opus number Chopin used was 65, that allocated to the Cello Sonata in G minor. He expressed a death-bed wish that all his unpublished manuscripts be destroyed. This included the early Piano Sonata No. 1; Chopin had assigned the Opus number 4 to it in 1828, and had even dedicated it to his teacher Elsner, but chose not to publish it. In 1851, Tobias Haslinger published it as Op. 4. Then, at the request of the composer's mother and sisters, Julian Fontana selected 23 other unpublished piano pieces and grouped them into eight opus numbers (Op. 66–73). These works were published in 1855.  In 1857, the known 17 Polish songs that had been written at various stages throughout Chopin's life were collected and published as Op. 74, the order of the songs within that opus having little regard for their actual order of composition.  Other songs have since come to light, but they are not part of Op. 74. Works that were published or have come to light since 1857 were not given opus numbers, and alternate catalogue designations are used for them.

Works with opus numbers

Published during Chopin's lifetime
Op. 1, Rondo in C minor (1825)
Op. 2, Variations on "La ci darem la mano" from Mozart's opera Don Giovanni, in B major, for piano and orchestra (1827)
Op. 3, Introduction and Polonaise brillante in C major for cello and piano (1829)
Op. 5, Rondo à la mazur in F major (1826)
Op. 6, 4 Mazurkas (1830)
 Mazurka in F minor
 Mazurka in C minor
 Mazurka in E major
 Mazurka in E minor
Op. 7, 5 Mazurkas (1830–1831)
 Mazurka in B major
 Mazurka in A minor (1829, revised 1830)
 Mazurka in F minor
 Mazurka in A major (1824, revised 1830)
 Mazurka in C major
Op. 8, Trio for Violin, Cello and Piano in G minor (1829)
Op. 9, 3 Nocturnes (1830–1831-1832)
 Nocturne in B minor
 Nocturne in E major
 Nocturne in B major
Op. 10, 12 Études (1829–1832)
 Étude in C major (1829-1830)
 Étude in A minor (1830)
 Étude in E major (1832)
 Étude in C minor (1832)
 Étude in G major (1830)
 Étude in E minor (1830)
 Étude in C major (1832)
 Étude in F major (1829)
 Étude in F minor (1829)
 Étude in A major (1829)
 Étude in E major (1829)
 Étude in C minor (1831)
Op. 11, Concerto for Piano and Orchestra No. 1 in E minor (1830)
Op. 12, Variations brillantes on "Je vends des Scapulaires" from Hérold's Ludovic, in B major  (1833)
Op. 13, Fantasy on Polish Airs in A major (1828-30)
Op. 14, Rondo à la Krakowiak in F major (1828)
Op. 15, 3 Nocturnes (1830–1833)
 Nocturne in F major
 Nocturne in F major
 Nocturne in G minor
Op. 16, Rondo in E major (1832-33)
Op. 17, 4 Mazurkas (1832–1833)
 Mazurka in B major
 Mazurka in E minor
 Mazurka in A major
 Mazurka in A minor
Op. 18, Grande valse brillante in E major (1831-33)
Op. 19, Boléro (1833)
Op. 20, Scherzo No. 1 in B minor (1831-33)
Op. 21, Concerto for Piano and Orchestra No. 2 in F minor (1829–1830)
Op. 22, Andante spianato et grande polonaise brillante in E major (the polonaise section orchestrated 1830-31; piano solo 1834)
Op. 23, Ballade No. 1 in G minor (1831–1835)
Op. 24, 4 Mazurkas (1834–1835)
 Mazurka in G minor
 Mazurka in C major
 Mazurka in A major
 Mazurka in B minor
Op. 25, 12 Études (1832–1836)
 Étude in A major  (1836)
 Étude in F minor (1836)
 Étude in F major (1836)
 Étude in A minor (1832–1834)
 Étude in E minor (1832–1834)
 Étude in G minor (1832–1834)
 Étude in C minor (1836)
 Étude in D major (1832–1834)
 Étude in G major (1832–1834)
 Étude in B minor (1832–1834)
 Étude in A minor (1834)
 Étude in C minor (1836)
Op. 26, 2 Polonaises (1834–1836)
 Polonaise in C minor
 Polonaise in E minor
Op. 27, 2 Nocturnes (1835-1836)
 Nocturne in C minor
 Nocturne in D major
Op. 28, 24 Preludes (1836–1839)
 Prelude in C major (composed 1839)
 Prelude in A minor (1838)
 Prelude in G major (1838–1839)
 Prelude in E minor (1838)
 Prelude in D major (1838–1839)
 Prelude in B minor (1838–1839)
 Prelude in A major (1836)
 Prelude in F minor (1838–1839)
 Prelude in E major (1838–1839)
 Prelude in C minor (1838–1839)
 Prelude in B major (1838–1839)
 Prelude in G minor (1838–1839)
 Prelude in F major (1838–1839)
 Prelude in E minor (1838–1839)
 Prelude in D major (1838–1839)
 Prelude in B minor (1838–1839)
 Prelude in A major (1836)
 Prelude in F minor (1838–1839)
 Prelude in E major (1838–1839)
 Prelude in C minor (1838–1839)
 Prelude in B major (1838–1839)
 Prelude in G minor (1838–1839)
 Prelude in F major (1838–1839)
 Prelude in D minor (1838–1839)
Op. 29, Impromptu No. 1 in A major (1837)
Op. 30, 4 Mazurkas (1836–1837)
 Mazurka in C minor
 Mazurka in B minor
 Mazurka in D major
 Mazurka in C minor
Op. 31, Scherzo No. 2 in B minor (1837)
Op. 32, 2 Nocturnes (1836–1837)
 Nocturne in B major
 Nocturne in A major
Op. 33, 4 Mazurkas (1837–1838)
 Mazurka in G minor
 Mazurka in D major
 Mazurka in C major
 Mazurka in B minor
Op. 34, 3 Waltzes (1831–1838)
 Waltz in A major (1835)
 Waltz in A minor (1831)
 Waltz in F major (1838)
Op. 35, Piano Sonata No. 2 in B minor ("Funeral March") (1839)
Op. 36, Impromptu No. 2 in F major (1839)
Op. 37, 2 Nocturnes (1838–1839)
 Nocturne in G minor
 Nocturne in G major
Op. 38, Ballade No. 2 in F major (1836–1839)
Op. 39, Scherzo No. 3 in C minor (1839)
Op. 40, 2 Polonaises (1838–1839)
 Polonaise in A major 
 Polonaise in C minor
Op. 41 4 Mazurkas (1838–1839)
 Mazurka in C minor
 Mazurka in E minor
 Mazurka in B major
 Mazurka in A major
Op. 42, Waltz in A major (1840)
Op. 43, Tarantelle in A major (1841)
Op. 44, Polonaise in F minor (1841)
Op. 45, Prelude in C minor (1841)
Op. 46, Allegro de concert in A major (1832–1841)
Op. 47, Ballade No. 3 in A major (1840–1841)
Op. 48, 2 Nocturnes (1841)
 Nocturne in C minor
 Nocturne in F minor
Op. 49, Fantaisie in F minor (1841)
Op. 50, 3 Mazurkas (1841–1842)
 Mazurka in G major
 Mazurka in A major
 Mazurka in C minor
Op. 51, Impromptu No. 3 in G major (1842)
Op. 52, Ballade No. 4 in F minor (1842)
Op. 53, Polonaise in A major (1842)
Op. 54, Scherzo No. 4 in E major (1842)
Op. 55, 2 Nocturnes (1843)
 Nocturne in F minor
 Nocturne in E major
Op. 56, 3 Mazurkas (1843)
 Mazurka in B major
 Mazurka in C major
 Mazurka in C minor
Op. 57, Berceuse in D major (1843)
Op. 58, Piano Sonata No. 3 in B minor (1844)
Op. 59, 3 Mazurkas (1845)
 Mazurka in A minor
 Mazurka in A major
 Mazurka in F minor
Op. 60, Barcarolle in F major (1845–1846)
Op. 61, Polonaise-Fantaisie in A major (1845–1846)
Op. 62, 2 Nocturnes (1846)
 Nocturne in B major
 Nocturne in E major
Op. 63, 3 Mazurkas (1846)
 Mazurka in B major
 Mazurka in F minor
 Mazurka in C minor
Op. 64, 3 Waltzes (1846–1847)
 Waltz in D major (1847)
 Waltz in C minor (1847)
 Waltz in A major (1840, some sources say 1847)
Op. 65, Sonata for Cello and Piano in G minor (1845–1846)

Published posthumously
Op. posth. 4, Piano Sonata No. 1 in C minor (1828)
Op. posth. 66, Fantaisie-Impromptu in C minor (1835)
Op. posth. 67, 4 Mazurkas (1835–1849)
 Mazurka in G major, WN 26 (1833 [1830? 1835?])
 Mazurka in G minor (1849)
 Mazurka in C major (1835)
 Mazurka in A minor (1846)
Op. posth. 68, 4 Mazurkas (1827–1849)
 Mazurka in C major (1829)
 Mazurka in A minor  (1827)
 Mazurka in F major  (1829)
 Mazurka in F minor  (1849; Last composition)
Op. posth. 69, 2 Waltzes (1829–1835)
 Waltz in A major (1835)
 Waltz in B minor (1829)
Op. posth. 70, 3 Waltzes (1829–1841)
 Waltz in G major (1832)
 Waltz in F minor (1841)
 Waltz in D major (1829)
Op. posth. 71, 3 Polonaises (1825–1828)
 Polonaise in D minor (1825)
 Polonaise in B major (1828)
 Polonaise in F minor (1828)
Op. posth. 72, (1826–1827)
 Nocturne in E minor (1827)
 Marche funèbre in C minor (1827; B.20)
 Three Écossaises (1826; B.12)
 Écossaise in D major
 Écossaise in G major
 Écossaise in D major
Op. posth. 73, Rondo in C major (versions for solo piano, WN deest., and two pianos, WN 15) (1828)
Op. posth. 74, 17 Polish Songs (1829–1847)
 "The Wish" ("Życzenie"), WN 21 (1829)
 "Spring" ("Wiosna"), WN 52 (1838)
 "The Sad River" ("Smutna Rzeka"), WN 39 (1831)
 "Merrymaking" ("Hulanka"), WN 32 (1830)
 "What She Likes" ("Gdzie lubi"), WN 22 (1829)
 "Out of My Sight" ("Precz z moich oczu") (1830)
 "The Messenger" ("Poseł") (1830)
 "Handsome Lad" ("Śliczny chłopiec") (1841)
 "From the Mountains, Where They Carried Heavy Crosses [Melody]" ("Z gór, gdzie dźwigali strasznych krzyżów brzemię [Melodia]") (1847)
 "The Warrior" ("Wojak") (1830)
 "The Double-End" ("Dwojaki koniec") (1845)
 "My Darling" ("Moja pieszczotka") (1837)
 "I Want What I Have Not" ("Nie ma czego trzeba") (1845)
 "The Ring" ("Pierścień") (1836)
 "The Bridegroom" ("Narzeczony") (1831)
 "Lithuanian Song" ("Piosnka litewska"), WN 58 (1831)
 "Leaves are Falling, Hymn from the Tomb" ("Śpiew z mogiłki") (1836)

Works without opus numbers

Note: Because different catalogue numbering systems have applied to the following works, they are ordered by year of publication.

Published during Chopin's lifetime

 1817: Polonaise in G minor, B. 1, KK IIa/1, S 1/1, WN 2 (written 1817)
 1826: 2 Mazurkas (G major, B major), B. 16, KK IIa/2-3, S 1/2 (1826)
 1833: Grand Duo concertant for Cello and Piano in E (written jointly with Auguste Franchomme, B. 70, KK IIb/2, S 2/1 (1832)
 1839: Variation No. 6 in E from Hexameron, B. 113, S 2/2 (1837)
 1840: Trois nouvelles études (F minor, A major, D major), B. 130, KK IIb/3, S 2/3 (1839)
 1841: Mazurka in A minor, Émile Gaillard, B. 140, KK IIb/5, S 2/5 (1840)
 1841: Mazurka in A minor, Notre Temps, B. 134, KK IIb/4, S 2/4(1841)

Published posthumously/ doubtful/ spurious
 1851: Variations in E major on the air "Der Schweizerbub", a.k.a. Introduction et Variations sur un lied allemand en mi majeur, B. 14, KK IVa/4, P 1/4 (1826)
 1856: Song Jakież kwiaty, jakie wianki, in C major, B. 39, KK IVa/9, P 1/9 (1829)
 1864: Polonaise in G minor, B. 6, KK IVa/3, P 1/3, WN 4 (1822/4)
 1868: Waltz in E minor, B. 56, KK IVa/15, P 1/15 (1830)
 1870: Polonaise in G major, B. 36, KK IVa/8, P 1/8 (1829)
 1870: Mazurka in C, B. 82, KK IVb/3, P 2/3 (1833)
 1871: Waltz in E major, B. 44, KK IVa/12, P 1/12 (1829)
 1875: 2 Mazurkas (G major, B major), B. 16, KK. IIa/2-3, S 1/2 (1826; these are the original versions of these works; their revised versions were originally published in the year of their composition, 1826, without opus numbers)
 1875: Mazurka in D, B. 31, KK IVa/7, P 1/7 (1829)
 1875: Nocturne in C minor, Lento con gran espressione, B. 49, KK IVa/16, P 1/16 (1830)
 1879: Polonaise in B minor. Adieu à Guillaume Kolberg, B. 13, KK IVa/5, P 1/5 (1826)
 1881: Variations in A: « Souvenir de Paganini », B. 37, KK IVa/10, P 1/10 (1829)
 1898: Fugue in A minor, B. 144, KK IVc/2, P 3/2 (1841–1842)
 1902: Polonaise in A major, B. 5, KK IVa/2, P 1/2 (1821)
 1902: Waltz in A major, B. 21, KK IVa/13, P 1/13 (1827)
 1902: Waltz in E major, B. 46, KK IVa/14, P 1/14 (1827)
 1909: Mazurka in B major, B. 73, KK IVb/1, P 2/1 (1832)
 1910: Mazurka in D major (Mazurek), B. 4, KK Anh. Ia/1, A 1/1 (1820)
 1910: Song "Rêverie" (Dumka, Mist Before My Eyes), A minor, B. 132, KK IVb/9, P 2/9 (1840)
 1910: Moderato in E major « Feuille d'album » (Album Leaf), B. 151, KK IVb/12, P 2/12 (1843)
 1918: Prelude in A major (ded. Pierre Wolff), B. 86, KK. IVb/7, P 2/7 (1834)
 1930: Mazurka in A major, B. 85, KK. IVb/4, P 2/4 (1834)
 1930: Prelude and Andantino animato, in F major, KK Anh Ia/2-3, A 1/2-3 (doubtful)
 1931: Cantabile in B major, B. 84, KK IVb/6, P 2/6
 1932: Waltz in F minor, Valse mélancolique, KK Ib/7, A 1/7 (Spurious attribution: the work is in fact by Charles Mayer, written about 1861 and originally titled "Le Regret, Op. 332").
 1938: Largo in E major, B. 109, KK. IVb/5
 1938: Nocturne in C minor, B. 108, KK IVb/8, P 2/8 (1837)
 1943: Contredanse in G major, B. 17. KK Anh Ia/4, A 1/4 (1826; doubtful)
 1947: Polonaise in B major, B. 3, KK IVa/1, P 1/1 (1817)
 1948: Canon in F minor, B. 129b, KK IVc/1
 1954: Song "Czary" (Enchantement), in D minor, B. 51, KK IVa/11, P 1/11 (1830; a facsimile version had been published in 1910)
 1955: Variations in E major for flute and piano on the air "Non più mesta" from Rossini's La Cenerentola, B. 9, KK Anh. Ia/5, A 1/5 (1824, spurious)
 1955: "Sostenuto" (a.k.a. Klavierstück; Waltz) in E major, B. 133, KK IVb/10, P 2/10 (1840)
 1955: Waltz in A minor, B. 150, KK IVb/11, P 2/11 (1843)
 1965: Introduction, Thème et Variations sur un air vénitien, in D major, for piano 4-hands, B.12a, KK IVa/6 (1826)
 1968: Bourrée No. 1 in G major, B. 160b/1, KK VIIb/1, D 2/1 (1848)
 1968: Bourrée No. 2 in A major, B. 160b/2, KK VIIb/2, D 2/2 (1846)
 ?: Galop in A (Galop Marquis), KK IVc/13, P 2/13 (1846)
 ?: Nocturne in C minor (Nocturne oublié), KK Anh Ia/6, A1/6 (spurious)
 ?: Introduction, Thème et Variations sur un thème de Thomas Moore en ré majeur in D, P 1/6 (1826)
 ?: Mazurka in D, P 2/2 (1832)
 ?: Klavierstück in E major, P 2/5 (1837)
 ?: Klavierstück in B major, P 2/6 (1834)
 ?: Allegretto in F major (1829?)
 2001: Prelude in E minor, Devil's Trill

See also
 List of compositions by Frédéric Chopin by genre
 Chopin National Edition

References

 
Lists of compositions by composer
Piano compositions by Polish composers
Lists of piano compositions by composer
Piano compositions in the Romantic era